In 2003 Pete Brough, one of the founder-members of German band Twelve Drummers Drumming, and Ralf Aussem, guitarist from the original 12DD cast, founder and mastermind behind Sun (German band), joined forces with vocalist Carlo van Putten and collectively gave life to Dead Guitars. 
 In 2003-2007 with Kurt Schmidt (Sun/12DD) on bass and Peter Körfer (Sun) on drums.
 In 2007 they were joined by Patrick Schmitz as drummer and Sven-Olaf Dirks on bass.
 In 2011 with Peter Körfer on bass and Swiss drummer Hermann Eugster (12DD)

In addition to being a principal writer and lead vocalist with German band The Convent, Carlo van Putten also had a flourishing partnership with the late Adrian Borland, mastermind behind the British cult band The Sound, working together under the name White Rose Transmission. He has worked with various others over the course of the years, including Marty Willson-Piper of The Church (band) and Mark Burgess of The Chameleons.

The music of Dead Guitars is described as an amalgamation of exhilarating downbeats, saturated electro-acoustic guitar work, and vocals that reflect an incisiveness and emotional intelligence.

The characteristic sound of the band is furthermore described as authentic pop, melancholic ballads, the renaissance of the “wall of sound”, those filigree, towering guitar riffs that make Ralf Aussem such an exceptional guitarist, and the surreal way his licks blend with clear song structures, shattering the listening habits of the pop genre.

Release of debut-album "Airplanes" June 2007 (echozone).
UK-release of "Flags"-album in January 2009, in Germany in March/April 2009 (echozone).

...Dead Guitars were invited by "The Mission-UK" in 2008 to play as special guests on their “European Tour”. Their 2nd album “Flags” featured guest appearances from Wayne Hussey (The Mission), Rich Vernon (The Mission) and Mark Gemini Thwaite (Tricky, The Mission, Peter Murphy...).

 
Their 2011-long player “Stranger” (silverbird-music) similarly showcases the collaboration of a coterie of prominent artists such as Michael Dempsey of "The Cure", 
Axel Ruhland of "M. Walking On The Water", Colin Drummond (12 DD), I. V. Webb (Adrian Borland), Thomas Kessler (Dissidenten), Crystin Fawn (Hearhear), Suzana Bradaric (Dharma Bums), 
Georg Sehrbrock (Belgium) and H. G. Haas (Teletunes)… this line-up alone making the Dead Guitars’ latest effort, “Stranger” an extraordinary blend of caliber, experience and authenticity. This superb quality is amplified by the essence of the music, a dexterous exercise uniting elements of new wave, pop and alternative pop which captivates both heart and mind leaving an impressive and lingering impression…

...Dead Guitars also played a number of 2011-dates with The Mission in the Netherlands and Germany. In 2012 Dead Guitars supported the "ChameleonsVox" feat. Mark Burgess on several shows in Germany.

Current band members
Carlo van Putten: Vocals
Ralf Aussem: Guitars
Peter Brough: Acoustic Guitars
Kurt Schmidt: Bass
Hermann Eugster: Drums

Former band members
Sven-Olaf Dirks: Bass
Patrick Schmitz: Drums
Peter Körfer: Bass

Albums
 2007 - Airplanes (debut album)
 2008 - Feels alright (EP)
 2009 - Flags (album)
 2011 - Mesmerized (EP)
 2011 - Stranger (album)
 2015 - Shelter (album)

External links
Dead Guitars Officially Homepage

German indie rock groups